Lobelia rhynchopetalum, the giant lobelia, is a plant endemic to Ethiopia. Its habitat is the Afroalpine climate of the Semien Mountains and Bale Mountains National Park.
Recent study show that it is under a threat of climate change.

References

External links
 

rhynchopetalum
Endemic flora of Ethiopia
Bale Mountains
Ethiopian Highlands
Simien Mountains
Plants described in 1877
Afromontane flora
Ethiopian montane moorlands
Alpine flora